The BET Hip Hop Award for Album of the Year is an award presented to recording artists for quality album at the BET Hip Hop Awards. It was originally titled CD of the Year, but it was changed during the 2013 ceremony.

Recipients
"‡" Indicates the album was nominated for the Grammy Award for Best Rap Album.
"†" Indicates the album won the Grammy Award for Best Rap Album.

Category facts

Notes

References

BET Awards
Hip hop awards
American music awards
Awards established in 2006
Album awards